"Summer Love" is a song by American recording artist Justin Timberlake from his second studio album FutureSex/LoveSounds (2006). The song was released as the fourth single from the album in April 2007. It was co-written and co-produced by Timberlake, along with Timothy "Timbaland" Mosley and Nate "Danja" Hills. The song was produced following Timberlake's two-year hiatus from the music industry; when he felt "burnt out" after the release of his debut solo album Justified in 2002. "Summer Love" is a dance-pop and pop song about "wanting to fall in love with the lusty seasonal lover". Its instrumentation consists of keyboards, drums, guitars, pianos and handclaps.

"Summer Love" received generally positive reviews from music critics; with some comparing it to his work with his former group 'N Sync. Despite not being officially released in the United States, "Summer Love" reached number six on the Billboard Hot 100 and number one on the Billboard Pop Songs chart. It was certified platinum by the Recording Industry Association of America (RIAA) for selling over one million units. The song also peaked at the top 10 in Belgium and Canada. "Summer Love" was included in the set list of Timberlake's second world tour FutureSex/LoveShow in 2007.

Production and release
When composing songs for his second studio album FutureSex/LoveSounds, Timberlake went to former Justified collaborator Timbaland's studio in Virginia Beach, Virginia, to begin sessions for his second album. However, not one of them had an idea of what the album would be–no plan for it and even a title. "Summer Love/Set the Mood (Prelude)" was written and produced by Timo "Timbaland" Mosley, Nate "Danja" Hills and Timberlake himself. The song was recorded by Jimmy Douglas, while its mixing was done by Douglas together with Timbaland. The keyboards were provided by Timberlake, Timbaland and Danja; the latter also played the drums in the single.

"Summer Love" was released as the sixth and final single from FutureSex/LoveSounds. The song was remixed with additional vocals by hip-hop rapper Stat Quo. A reviewer of DJ Booth commented that the collaboration will "burn up the dance floors". He also explained that "the collaboration is chalked full of infectious production work from none other than Timbo [Timbaland]."

Composition

"Summer Love" is an uptempo pop song, with a length of 4 minutes and 13 seconds. According to digital sheet music published at Musinotes.com by Universal Music Publishing Group, "Summer Love" was written in the key of D minor, in common time with a moderately slow 96 beat-per-minute tempo. Timberlake's vocal range in the song spans from the low note of D4 to the high note of A5. Its instrumentation consists of keyboards, drums, guitar, piano and handclaps.  Barry Schwartz of Stylus Magazine praised the song and commented that "with its good foot hesitation boom-clap and cascading chorus synthline" 'Summer Love' shows Timberlake's best vocals on FutureSex/LoveSounds." Schwartz further said that "the beat drops out while he sings in perfect harmony, 'Tell me how they got that pretty little face on that pretty little frame girl'".  Lyrically, the single is about "wanting to fall in love with the lusty seasonal lover".

Critical reception

Critics reacted in a generally positive manner to "Summer Love". Barry Schwartz of Stylus Magazine gave "Summer Love" a positive review and additionally praised "its good foot hesitation boom-clap and cascading chorus". Alexis Petridis of The Guardian stated, "a dreary central-casting pop ballad called 'Summer Love' is enlivened only by another of Timberlake's peculiar announcements: 'I'm sick and tired of trying to save the world.' Shaheem Reid and Jayson Rodriguez off MTV News stated that "Summer Love" alongside Timberlake's 2007 singles "My Love" and "LoveStoned", rocked every iPod, stereo player and stadium during his tour. North by Northwestern's Dagny Salas called "Summer Love/Set the Mood (Interlude)" a stand-out track on FutureSex/LoveSounds. According to him the song "oozes sun, sex, and a sultry affair". A reviewer of IGN commented that "the bulk of the album is focused on funk lite, but with 'Summer Love/Set The Mood (Prelude)' Timberlake and Timbaland slip into darkness." An editor of Billboard criticized Timbaland's production: "[W]hile the track offers cunning instrumentation, Timbaland's heavy production hand is so overwhelming that the singer is pushed to the back of the track".

Commercial performance
The song debuted at number 74 on the US Billboard Hot 100 chart in the issue dated April 28, 2007. After seven weeks on the chart, on June 9, 2007, the single reached its peak at number six. The next week it fell to number eight and stayed on the position for four weeks, before falling to number nine in the issue dated July 14, 2007. "Summer Love" became Timberlakes's sixth single to reach the top 10 and stayed a total of 20 weeks on the chart. It ranked at number 39 on Billboards Best of 2007 – Hot 100 Songs. The single debuted on the US Pop Songs chart at number 39 in the issue dated April 21, 2007, and peaked at number one on June 23, 2007. "Summer Love" became Timberlake's fifth number one single on the US Pop Songs chart. For the issue dated July 28, 2007, the song peaked at number 24 on the US Adult Pop Songs chart. It was certified platinum by the Recording Industry Association of America (RIAA) after one million downloads of the song were sold. As of 2018, the song has sold 1.6 million copies in the country. "Summer Love" peaked at number eight on the Canadian Hot 100 chart, for the issue dated June 30, 2007 and stayed on the chart for 16 weeks.

Elsewhere, the song attained moderate success. In New Zealand, "Summer Love" debuted at number 35 on August 27, 2007. After thirteen weeks fluctuating on the chart it reached its peak of fifteen on November 26, 2007. The song stayed on the chart for total of 19 weeks. In Europe, the single entered on six national charts. In Austria it debuted at number 52, and after two weeks the song peaked at number 47. It stayed on the chart for total of seven weeks. "Summer Love" was more successful in Belgium, where it reached number six on the Flandrian Singles Chart and number eight on the Wallonian Singles Chart. The single entered the Swedish Singles Chart at number 53 and the next week it reached its peak at number 38. In Germany, "Summer Love" charted together with "Until the End of Time" and peaked at number 39. It stayed on the chart for nine weeks. The song also reached number 22 on the Slovakian Singles Chart.

Track listing
 CD single "Summer Love" — 4:13
 "Until the End of Time" (duet with Beyoncé) — 5:22

Credits and personnelTechnical Recorded and mixed at Thomas Crown Studios in Virginia Beach, VirginiaPersonnel'''
Credits are adapted from the liner notes of FutureSex/LoveSounds''.
 Jimmy Douglas – Recording, mixing
 Nate "Danja" Hills – Drums, keyboards, production, songwriting
 Tim "Timbaland" Mosley – Drums, keyboards, mixing, production, songwriting
 Justin Timberlake – Background vocals, keyboards, production, songwriting

Charts

Weekly charts

Year-end charts

Certifications

Release history

References

External links
 

2006 songs
2007 singles
Justin Timberlake songs
Song recordings produced by Danja (record producer)
Song recordings produced by Timbaland
Songs written by Justin Timberlake
Songs written by Timbaland
Songs written by Danja (record producer)
Song recordings produced by Justin Timberlake